Zachos Milios (1805–1860) was a Greek revolutionary of the Greek War of Independence (1821–1830) and officer of the Hellenic army. He was the brother of the distinguished general and politician Spyros Milios.

Greek War of Independence

Milios was born in Himarë, in modern south coast Albania. At 1824, under the leadership of his brother Spyromilios, he together with several armed Himariotes descent to southern Greece in order to join the Revolution. There they fought against the Ottoman troops of Omer Vryonis, under the orders of Alexandros Mavrokordatos. At 1825, together with his brother, as well as Notis Botsaris and Dimos Riniassas participated in several conflicts in Aetolia region (Makrynoros, Kasteli Anatolikou). The same year they joined the besiegers in Missolonghi. Zachos also participated in the following exodus. Later he fought under the leadership of Georgios Karaiskakis.

Milios supported the political party of Alexandros Mavrokordatos and joined the Pro-Russian party. During Kapodistrias' rule (1828–1832) he became captain of the 2nd light infantry battalion.

After Independence
When Otto became King of Greece (1832), he remained in the army serving as a frontier guard. He was considered a very loyal officer and became a vivid supporter of the Megali Idea, like most of the Greek officers born outside Greece's border in that period did.

Zachos Milios reached the rank of Colonel. He was distinguished by his bravery on the battlefield (he was seriously wounded four times).

References

Sources
British documents on foreign affairs: reports and papers from the Foreign Office confidential print. Kenneth Bourne, David Stevenson, Donald Cameron Watt, John F. V. Keiger, Great Britain. University Publications of America, 1991. 

1805 births
1860 deaths
19th-century Greek people
Hellenic Army officers
Greek people of the Greek War of Independence
People from Himara
19th-century Greek military personnel